Zealanapis is a genus of South Pacific araneomorph spiders in the family Anapidae, first described by Norman I. Platnick & Raymond Robert Forster in 1989.

Species
 it contains ten species, all found in New Zealand:
Zealanapis armata (Forster, 1951) – New Zealand
Zealanapis australis (Forster, 1951) – New Zealand
Zealanapis conica (Forster, 1951) – New Zealand
Zealanapis insula Platnick & Forster, 1989 – New Zealand
Zealanapis kuscheli Platnick & Forster, 1989 – New Zealand
Zealanapis matua Platnick & Forster, 1989 – New Zealand
Zealanapis montana Platnick & Forster, 1989 – New Zealand
Zealanapis otago Platnick & Forster, 1989 – New Zealand
Zealanapis punta Platnick & Forster, 1989 – New Zealand
Zealanapis waipoua Platnick & Forster, 1989 – New Zealand

References

External links

Anapidae
Araneomorphae genera
Spiders of New Zealand
Taxa named by Raymond Robert Forster